Dalpiazia is a prehistoric genus of sclerorhynchid sawfish whose fossils are found in rocks dating from the Maastrichtian stage in mines in Jordan and Syria, and in Morocco. The type species D. stromeri was named in honor of Ernst Stromer.

The validity of Dalpiazia has been questioned on the basis of its similarities to Ischyrhiza, a subgenus of Onchosaurus.

See also 
 Flora and fauna of the Maastrichtian stage
 List of prehistoric cartilaginous fish (Chondrichthyes)

References 

Prehistoric cartilaginous fish genera
Cretaceous cartilaginous fish
Prehistoric fish of Africa